Aethalopteryx gazelle is a moth in the family Cossidae. It is found primarily in Kenya.

References

Moths described in 2011
Aethalopteryx